Communist Cells (originally , CC) was a Marxist-Leninist and left-wing nationalist political organization operating in the Canary Islands. The party aim was self-determination for the islands and socialism.

History
The members of the Communist Party of Spain (PCE) who opposed the reformist trend that ended being called "Eurocommunism" supported by the Central Committee of the PCE, and being in the situation of loss of organic link with his party, or even having been sanctioned, decided to create autonomous cells inside the party, but with their own political line. José Satué and Fernando Sagaseta were the leaders of the organization.

In 1976 CC left the PCE because the party banned cell-type organization, considering that the upcoming legalization made that kind of organization an anachronism. CC left the party due to this decision.

In 1977 CC participated in the coalition United Canarian People, that in 1979 became Canarian People's Union (UPC). UPC gained an MP in the legislative elections of 1979, Fernando Sagaseta, which was also a member of CC.

In 1980-1981 the importance of CC declined and internal conflicts arose. In 1984 the majority of the party joined the Communist Party of the Peoples of Spain (PCPE), and (de facto) CC disappeared. In theory, CC never dissolved, but currently has no public activity.

See also
 Canarian nationalism

References

 Vera Jiménez, Fernando (2009). «La diáspora comunista en España». Asociación de Historia Actual (HAOL). ISSN 1696-2060 (20, Otoño 2009): 34–48.

Political parties in the Canary Islands
Defunct communist parties in Spain
Defunct nationalist parties in Spain
Canarian nationalist parties
Left-wing nationalist parties
Anti-Francoism
Canarian nationalism